The Antas da Valeira are two Chalcolithic dolmen, or burial chambers, about 100 metres apart, close to the village of Nossa Senhora da Graça do Divor in the Évora district of the Alentejo region of Portugal. Situated in a farm field about one kilometer from the Vale Maria do Meio Cromlech and ten kilometers from the notable megalithic complex of the Almendres Cromlech, these dolmen are among numerous megalithic sites identified in the Évora area. These two monuments have yet to be studied by archaeologists and are in a poor condition.

Anta da Valeira 1 is situated between two olive trees. It consists of a degraded polygonal chamber with traces of an entrance corridor and tumulus. Six large stones or pillars can be seen but all have fallen from their original positions. There is no trace of a capstone or an entrance corridor. Anta da Valeira 2 is also in a bad condition. Five large stones that would have served as pillars remain on the site, which has been much affected by agricultural work.

References

External links

Megalithic monuments in Portugal
Prehistoric sites in Portugal
Dolmens in Portugal